Hot Cargo is a 1946 American drama film directed by Lew Landers and written by Daniel Mainwaring. The film stars William Gargan, Jean Rogers, Phillip Reed, Larry Young, Harry Cording and Will Wright. The film was released on June 28, 1946, by Paramount Pictures.

Plot 

The first thing soldiers Joe and Chris do after coming home from the war is fulfill the quirky final wishes of a pal. Kissing a woman who owns a lumber mill is on the list, and after Chris plants one on an unsuspecting Jerry Walters, she slaps his face.

Going to visit their late friend's family, the Chapmans, they find its trucking business in total disarray. Chris is a botanist and Joe's career is baseball, but they put their own lives on hold to help the family. Although she had begun to take a shine to him, Jerry is offended when Chris asks her to let the Chapmans haul her lumber, believing she's been romanced with an ulterior motive.

Warren Porter is jealous of this interest in Jerry, and he and his boss, Matt Wayne, scheme against the newcomers and the family. Things get out of hand when one of the Chapmans is killed. Wayne ends up taking Jerry hostage and shooting Porter, after which the police, aided by Joe and Chris, arrive to save her.

Cast 
William Gargan as Joe Harkness
Jean Rogers as Jerry Walters
Phillip Reed as Chris Bigelow
Larry Young as Warren Porter
Harry Cording as Matt Wayne
Will Wright as Tim Chapman
Virginia Brissac as Mrs. Chapman
David Holt as Peter Chapman
Elaine Riley as Porter's Secretary
Dick Elliott as Frankie

References

External links 
 

1946 films
Paramount Pictures films
American drama films
1946 drama films
Films directed by Lew Landers
American black-and-white films
1940s English-language films
1940s American films